Constantine II of Armenia may refer to:

 Constantine II, Prince of Armenia, who ruled around 1129/1130
 Constantine II, King of Armenia, who ruled from 1342–1344
 Constantine II the Woolmaker, catholicos in 1286–1289	and 1307–1322